Angels on the Edge of Time is a 2015 collaborative live album of musical improvisations by Lindsay Cooper, Fred Frith, Gianni Gebbia and Lars Hollmer. It was recorded on 30 May 1992 at the AngelicA Festival Internazionale di Musica in Bologna, Italy, and released by I Dischi di Angelica in January 2015. This is the only album released by the quartet.

Background
The quartet of Cooper and Frith from Henry Cow, Hollmer from Samla Mammas Manna, and free improvising saxophonist Gebbia came about at the suggestion of Massimo Simonini, director of the AngelicA Festival for its 1992 event. Frith said it was a combination that he would never have thought of, but once they were on stage, "it made perfect sense". The quartet never performed again, and it was the last time Frith played with Cooper. Hollmer and Cooper died in 2008 and 2013, respectively.

In the album's liner notes Frith reflected on Cooper and Hollmer's demise, calling them "two ... influential, passionate people" who "revel[ed] in the joy of making music" despite the hardships and setbacks they faced. Frith described the quartet's AngelicA performance as "a unique occasion", and said he was "happy and touched" by the release of this album as it reminded him of "a very special moment".

Reception

In a review in All About Jazz, Alberto Bazzurro wrote that Angels on the Edge of Time is an important, "historical" document that highlights Lindsay Cooper's relevance as an improvisor 24 years ago. Bazzurro felt that while not too much happens in this impromptu performance, the first half of the CD is interesting, in particular the third, three-part track, "Elegy for an Angel", which he said is nicely structured.

Track listing
All tracks composed by Lindsay Cooper, Fred Frith, Gianni Gebbia and Lars Hollmer.

Sources: Liner notes, Discogs, AllMusic.

Personnel
Lindsay Cooper – sopranino saxophone, bassoon, electronics
Fred Frith – electric guitar, violin, radio, harmonica, voice
Gianni Gebbia – alto saxophone, sopranino saxophone, bird calls, voice 
Lars Hollmer – accordion, melodica, keyboard, voice

Sources: Liner notes, Discogs.

Sound and artwork
Recorded by Roberto Monari at AngelicA Festival Internazionale di Musica, Aula Absidale di S. Lucia, Bologna, Italy, 30 May 1992; mastered by Bob Drake at Studio Midi-Pyrénées, La Borde Basse, Caudeval, France, November 2014.
Massimo Simonini – executive producer
Fred Frith – liner notes
Concetta Nasone – design, cover art
Massimo Golfieri – design, cover art
Gianni Gosdan – concert photographs

Sources: Liner notes, Discogs.

References

External links
Angels on the Edge of Time at I Dischi di Angelica on Bandcamp

2015 live albums
Collaborative albums
Experimental music albums
Live free improvisation albums
Fred Frith live albums